Borderside, also known as Brydon Mansion, was a historic home located at Bloomington, Garrett County, Maryland, United States. It was a -story, with 3-story tower, Italianate style brick structure that burned in the mid- to late 1970s. The tower had a pronounced bell-curve Mansard roof. It was built in 1870 for William A. Brydon, a coal and lumber dealer and member of the Maryland House of Delegates in 1867.

Borderside was listed on the National Register of Historic Places in 1975.

References

External links
, including photo from 1974, at Maryland Historical Trust

Houses in Garrett County, Maryland
Houses on the National Register of Historic Places in Maryland
Houses completed in 1870
Italianate architecture in Maryland
National Register of Historic Places in Garrett County, Maryland